Andronikos Kakoullis (born 3 May 2001) is a Cypriot footballer who plays as a forward for Omonia and the Cyprus national team.

Career statistics

Club

International career
He made his national team debut on 7 October 2020 in a friendly against Czech Republic. and scored his international goals against Slovenia in 1–2 loss match at the 2022 FIFA World Cup qualification.

International goals
Scores and results list Cyprus's goal tally first.

Honours
Omonia
 Cypriot First Division: 2020–21
 Cypriot Cup: 2021–22
 Cypriot Super Cup: 2021

References

Living people
2001 births
Cypriot footballers
Cyprus youth international footballers
Cyprus international footballers
Association football forwards
AC Omonia players
Cypriot First Division players